A referendum on the reform of the Catalan Statute of Autonomy was held in Catalonia on Sunday, 18 June 2006. Voters were asked whether they ratified a statutory amendment which effectively approved a new Statute of Autonomy of Catalonia. The draft Statute had been submitted to the consideration of the Spanish Cortes Generales earlier in the year, where it had been approved in both the Congress of Deputies on 30 March (with a 189–154 result) and in the Spanish Senate on 10 May (with a 128–125 result).

The question asked was "Do you approve of the Statute of Autonomy of Catalonia Bill?". The referendum resulted in 78.1% of valid votes in support of the bill on a turnout of 48.9%, and resulted in the approval of a new Statute of Autonomy replacing the 1979 Statute, which received royal assent on 19 July and was published in the Official State Gazette on 20 July 2006.

Results

Results by province

See also
2007 Andalusian Statute of Autonomy referendum

References

2006 referendums
2006 in Catalonia
Referendums in Catalonia
Catalonia
June 2006 events in Europe